The Motorola C168/C168i is a low-cost 850/1900-band GSM mobile phone, made by Motorola. It was released in the fourth quarter of 2005.

Main Features 

 Downloadable wallpaper, screensaver and ringtones
 MMS and SMS
 WAP 2.0 and GPRS for Internet access
 FM stereo radio

References 
 Product page on Motorola website

C168
Mobile phones introduced in 2005